Proboscidula is a genus of African comb-footed spiders that was first described by F. Miller in 1970.  it contains two species, found in Africa: P. loricata and P. milleri.

See also
 List of Theridiidae species

References

Further reading

Araneomorphae genera
Spiders of Africa
Theridiidae